Nikolai Viktorovich Vasilyev (born April 10, 1957 in Voronezh) is a Russian professional football coach and a former player.

Honours
 Soviet Cup finalist: 1982.

External links
 Career summary by KLISF

1957 births
Living people
Soviet footballers
Russian footballers
Russian football managers
FC Moscow managers
FC Fakel Voronezh players
FC Torpedo Moscow players
FC Zimbru Chișinău players
FC Tiraspol players
Soviet Top League players
Association football midfielders
Sportspeople from Voronezh